Carlia gracilis, the slender rainbow skink, is a species of skink in the genus Carlia. It is native to Northern Territory and Western Australia in Australia.

References

Carlia
Reptiles described in 1974
Endemic fauna of Australia
Skinks of Australia
Taxa named by Glen Milton Storr